Sergiu T. Niță (1883 in Peresecina – 3 March 1940 in Bucharest) was a politician and lawyer from Romania. He served as Minister for Bessarabia (1920–1921, 1926–1927) in the Averescu cabinets.

Biography
Sergiu Niță was born on March 21 (March 9 according to the old style) in 1883 in the Bessarabian village Peresecina (now Orhei District of the Republic of Moldova) into the family of a priest, Fyodor Niță, the rector of St. Michael's Church in the village of Peresecina.

After a while, the family moved to Chișinău.

Education 
Sergiu Niță studied in Chișinău. Father Fyodor Niță, a graduate of the Chișinău Theological Seminary, was a friend with the Moldavian writer Constantin Stere, who convinced him to send his son Sergiu to study at the Law Faculty of the University of Iași.

Career  
Sergiu Niță became president of the Administrative Court of Chișinău. After the Union of Bessarabia with Romania, Niță served as member of the Parliament of Romania and Minister for Bessarabia in the Government of Alexandru Averescu (2 May 1920 - 17 December 1921 and 20 March 1926 - 3 June 1927). As minister for Bessarabia, he was the head of the initiative group who established the first Romanian language theater in Chișinău, on 10 October 1920.

He was a leader of the Bessarabian Peasants' Party. Internal divisions caused the party to split, with one group led by Niță joining the People's League in April 1920.

In 1925, during a visit to Chișinău, King  Ferdinand I of Romania stopped at the residence of Niță (the second house on Sergei Lazo Street from Ștefan cel Mare Boulevard).

Death 
Niță died on 3 March 1940 in Bucharest; he was buried in the Central (Armenian) cemetery in Chișinău.

Awards 
 Order of the Star of Romania, Officer rank.
 Order of the Crown of Romania, Officer rank.
 Order of Ferdinand I, Commander rank.

References

External links 
 Sergiu Niță

1883 births
1940 deaths
Romanian jurists
Ministers for Bessarabia
People from Orhei District
Officers of the Order of the Star of Romania
Officers of the Order of the Crown (Romania)
People from Bessarabia Governorate
Alexandru Ioan Cuza University alumni